Eduardo "Teddy" Williams (born 1987) is an Argentine film director. He first studied at Universidad del Cine in Buenos Aires, and then in Fresnoy, France, under the tutorship of Portuguese director Miguel Gomes. Williams works within an avant-garde/experimental tradition, and has made the feature film The Human Surge, in addition to a number of short films. His works have been presented at film festivals such as Cannes, Locarno, Toronto and New York. He frequently works with his partner and fellow countryman  actor Nahuel Pérez Biscayart.

Filmography 
 Tan atentos [So Attentive] (2011, 8 min.)
 Could See a Puma [Pude ver un Puma] (2011, 18 min.)
 Alguien los vio [They were seen] (2011, 17 min.)
 The Sound of the Stars Dazes Me [El ruido de las estrellas me aturde] (2012, 20 min.)
 That I’m Falling? [Que je tombe tout le temps?] (2013, 15 min.)
 I forgot! [Tôi quên roi!] (2014, 26 min.)
 The Human Surge [El Auge del Humano] (2016, 97 min.)
 Parsi (2018)
 No es (2019, 20 min.)

References

External links

 Eduardo Williams' channel on Vimeo
 Pude ver un Puma on Vimeo
 I Forgot on Vdrome
 Interview with Williams on Parsi by Festival Punto de Vista
 Eduardo Williams' ten favorite films from the last ten years, on the website of film distributor Grasshopper Film

1987 births
Argentine film directors
Living people
People from Buenos Aires